Alpandeire is a Spanish municipality and village located in the Ronda area, near the peak of Jarestepar, (1,421 metres high), and surrounded by rugged scenery. A number of streams run through its territory. The municipality belongs to Málaga province, in the autonomous community of Andalusia.

History
In Moorish times, Alpandeire was a fort built by the Saracens after the battle of Guadalete. It is believed that there were human settlements in Alpandeire in pre-historic times, since burial grounds discovered in the area point right to the Iron and Bronze Ages.

In 1815 Alpandeire obtained the title of Villazgo as an award by Fernando VII for the stubborn resistance of its population during the French occupation.

The "Virgen del Rosario" is the traditional patron saint of Alpandeire.

Demography
The municipality has a population of 291 (male: 144, female: 147), an area of 31 km2 and a population density of 9.04.  Six (5%) of the Alpandeire residents are foreigners.

Local administration

The former mayor of Alpandeire was Ms. Raquel Mena Medinilla, of the coalition Izquierda Unida- Los Verdes – Convocatoria por Andalucía prior to the municipal elections of May 2007. This coalition had three councillors in the town's ayuntamiento, while the Partido Socialista Obrero Español had three, and the Partido Popular had one.  The current mayor came into office in June 2007 and is from the PSOE.

Elections

In the 2004 Spanish General Election the ruling Partido Socialista Obrero Español got 54.3% of the vote in Alpandeire, the Partido Popular got 25.3%, Izquierda Unida got 14.0%, and the Partido Andalucista got 3.8%.

References

External links

Official site 

Municipalities in the Province of Málaga